SkipTheDishes (styled capitalized, sometimes shortened to just SKIP) is a Canadian online food delivery service headquartered in Winnipeg, Manitoba and a division of Dutch-based Just Eat Takeaway.com. Users can order and pay for food from participating restaurants online using an application on the iOS or Android platforms, or through a web browser. Users are also able to provide feedback by reviewing restaurants after receiving an order. It was founded in 2012 in Saskatoon, and later purchased by UK-based Just Eat in 2016, with Just Eat retaining the name. SkipTheDishes was subsequently folded into Just Eat Takeaway following Just Eat's acquisition in 2020, and assumed Takeaway.com's orange branding and logo.

History

SkipTheDishes was founded in 2012 by brothers Josh and Chris Simair. At the time, Chris was living in Saskatchewan and working at Cameco Corporation as an IT Solutions Architect and Josh was likewise living in Saskatchewan, in the city of Saskatoon. Josh had previously been working with RBC as an investment banker in London, England. Each day, Josh and his colleagues worked long hours and often ordered food to their office from local restaurants. Josh began to recognise that there was an opportunity to build out a more efficient online food ordering delivery network. Eventually, both resigned from their jobs and began working on the concept for what is now SkipTheDishes. They launched the network in their home city of Saskatoon and eventually moved to Winnipeg, Manitoba, to set up the tech company's head office.

During the first few years of operations, the co-founders bootstrapped the company and raised a small round of seed capital from angel investors. Soon after, the co-founders raised additional capital from private investors, as well as four prominent venture capital firms—Golden Venture Partners (Toronto), Founder Collective (New York), Felicis Ventures (Menlo Park, CA), and FJ Labs (Cambridge, MA).

Between 2012 and 2014, three additional co-founders joined to help grow the startup. Another brother, Daniel Simair, joined, along with two friends from university: Jeff Adamson and Andrew Chau.

Acquisition, growth, and expansion 
As the company scaled between 2013 and 2016, the co-founders launched SkipTheDishes in many Canadian cities, initially focusing on mid-market cities, including Burnaby, East Vancouver, Calgary, Edmonton, Red Deer, Prince Albert, Grande Prairie, Regina, Saskatoon, Winnipeg, Mississauga, Etobicoke, Kitchener/Waterloo, and Ottawa; as well as US cities, including Columbus, Cleveland, Cincinnati, Buffalo, Omaha, and St. Louis.

In December 2016, SkipTheDishes was acquired by Just Eat for $200 million. SkipTheDishes remained a subsidiary and separate brand from Just Eat, with its headquarters remaining in Winnipeg. As of September 2018, Just Eat Canada redirects to SkipTheDishes.

Over the course of 2017, SkipTheDishes was recognised for its growth on a number of occasions. The company's founder was chosen as one of Canada's Top 40 Under 40. Just Eat's CEO, Peter Plumb, reported significant increases in the company's Q3-2017 revenue, due to "strong growth in order numbers and the inclusion of SkipTheDishes business."

In 2017, the company expanded its business model into new offerings other than food, starting with alcohol delivery in select markets.

In March 2019, SkipTheDishes pulled out of the United States market. Their business and drivers were transferred to Grubhub. In early 2020, Just Eat merged with Netherlands-based competitor Takeaway.com, forming Just Eat Takeaway, shortly thereafter announcing a deal to acquire the aforementioned Grubhub (whom also acquired SkipTheDishes' American operations before their acquisition). In July 2020, in line with Just Eat's other markets, SkipTheDishes adopted Takeaway.com's logo and orange colour scheme, though keeping the SkipTheDishes brand name.

In late 2021, SkipTheDishes began testing a new offering called Skip Express Lane, a service that delivers household goods and groceries directly to customers. The service is located in Winnipeg and in London, Ontario.

Marketing 
In October 2018, SkipTheDishes ran a series of ads featuring actor Jon Hamm as an "honourary Canadian." He remains a fixture in their marketing campaign as of January 2021.

Since 2019, SkipTheDishes ran a series of French-language ads, notably in Quebec, featuring comedian Patrick Groulx. His ads since October 2020 and early 2021 focused on promoting "les Récompenses SKIP" or Skip's loyalty points program.

In February 2020, SkipTheDishes entered into a multiyear marketing relationship with the Toronto Defiant, an esports team in the Overwatch League.

In summer 2021, ahead of the 2020 Olympic Games, SkipTheDishes was named the "Official Food Delivery App" of the Canadian Olympic Committee.

As of 2022, SkipTheDishes has adopted the ‘Did Somebody Say…’ advertising campaign used by sister chains Just Eat and Menulog internationally.

Criticism
Like many companies involved in the sharing economy, SkipTheDishes has received criticism for its business practices. In March 2017, the company received negative publicity for its responses to a job candidate's question about compensation and benefits. As a follow up to the incident, Emily Norgang of the Canadian Labour Congress stated that "the most innovative aspect isn't the technology itself, but actually the expansion of this exploitative business model." , SkipTheDishes has the lowest rating of F from the Better Business Bureau due to volume of unresolved complaints.

References

Food and drink in Manitoba
Online food ordering
Retail companies established in 2012
Transport companies established in 2012
Internet properties established in 2012
Companies based in Winnipeg
2012 establishments in Manitoba